Chad Dukes (born Chad Sisson; December 7, 1978, in Alexandria, Virginia) is a former radio personality. He was the afternoon drive host of Chad Dukes Vs. the World on WJFK 106.7 The Fan—a sports talk format radio station in the greater Washington D.C. area. He was also a co-host of the Big O and Dukes Show and several other podcasts. As of January 1, 2021, he hosted the Chad Dukes Show.

Early life
Chad Dukes, born Chad Sisson, 
is a native of Burke, Virginia,  and a graduate of Lake Braddock Secondary School. He is a college drop out, having once been enrolled at George Mason University where he began his radio broadcasting career working in college radio for WGMU.

Dukes is a lifelong fan of the Washington Commanders.

Career
Dukes began his radio career at 98.7 WMZQ working in the promotions department. He then transitioned to WHFS (99.1) in Washington, D.C., where he was an intern for The Sports Junkies. There he met fellow intern Oscar "The Big O" Santana. Together they created the Big O and Dukes Show which debuted at night after Loveline. The show's initial run ended January 12, 2005, when CBS Radio changed the WHFS format to Spanish language, and rebranded the station as WLZL "El Zol".

Dukes moved to WJFK/WHFS (105.7) in Baltimore, Maryland in 2005, where the Big O and Dukes Show replaced Out to Lunch Show in the midday (11:00 AM – 3:00 PM) timeslot. Building on a popular segment, the show became Ed Norris with Big O & Dukes when it added former Baltimore police commissioner Ed Norris. Shortly after Norris arrived, CBS Radio dropped Dukes and Santana, and renamed the program the Ed Norris Show. Dukes moved to ESPN Radio 1300 AM, where he co-hosted an afternoon drive sports/talk show.

In June 2006, Dukes and Santana moved to Phoenix, Arizona to replace KZON's The Phil Hendrie Show upon the retirement of Phil Hendrie. The Big O and Dukes Show's run in Arizona ended on June 21, 2007 when KZON flipped its format to hip hop, becoming 101.5 JAMZ. 

After a short hiatus, Dukes returned to the Washington, D.C. airwaves. On July 16, 2007 The Big O and Dukes Show debuted on WJFK-FM in the evening timeslot (7:00 - 11:00 p.m.), following the station's flagship Don and Mike Show. In 2008 the show was moved to mid-days beginning at 10 a.m. following The Junkies and ending at 3 p.m. preceding the Mike O'Meara Show.

On July 20, 2009 WJFK-FM switched formats from hot talk to sports talk radio and became 106.7 The Fan DC. Dukes broadcast "The LaVar Arrington Show with Chad Dukes" with former Washington Redskins linebacker LaVar Arrington from 2-6pm and a solo show called Chad Dukes Vs. The World from 6-7pm from July 2009 until July 2014. The 2-6pm block was renamed Chad Dukes Vs. The World in July 2014 after Arrington departed for a full-time position with the NFL Network.

On July 16, 2010, Dukes and Santana reunited for a weekly podcast styled on their terrestrial radio show. Big O and Dukes ended immediately after Dukes was fired from WJFK for "racist and other inappropriate comments". The last episode of Big O and Dukes was published October 27, 2020. 

On October 30, 2020, WJFK 106.7 announced that Dukes was fired from his job at the station because of allegedly racist comments made on his podcast.

Side projects
Dukes was co-host of the short-lived Snack and Soda Show. The program ran Sundays on WJFK from 2007–08, with Dukes and producer Matt Cahill broadcasting under the pseudonyms "Snack" and "Soda," respectively. Together they critiqued various snack foods and reported on snack food industry news and rumors. The show's final installment aired April 20, 2008.

Dukes was hosting the Weird and Pissed Off podcast, and occasionally The Pinball Shitheads podcast. He and Arrington have hosted "Sportsweek with LaVar Arrington and Chad Dukes" on WDCW. Dukes was the host of The Chad Dukes Wrestling Show Podcast.

References

External links
 
 Chad Dukes on Myspace
 The Big O and Dukes Podcast dead link

1978 births
American male comedians
21st-century American comedians
American sports radio personalities
American talk radio hosts
People from Alexandria, Virginia
People from Burke, Virginia
Living people
George Mason University alumni